Tengiz, Teniz, or Tengis is a Turco-Mongol word meaning sea.

It may refer to:
 Tengiz Lake, a lake in Akmola Region, Kazakhstan
 Tengizi Islands, an island chain sited within Lake Tengiz 
 Tengiz Field, an oil field in Atyrau Region, Kazakhstan
 Teniz, Kamysty District, a lake in Kostanay Region, Kazakhstan
 Teniz, Mendykara District, a lake in Kostanay Region, Kazakhstan
 Teniz, Yereymentau District, a lake in Akmola Region, Kazakhstan
 Tengis River, a river in Mongolia.

See also
Tenis